The Sugar River is a  river located in western New Hampshire in the United States. It is a tributary of the Connecticut River, which flows to Long Island Sound.

The Sugar River begins at the outlet of Lake Sunapee in the town of Sunapee, New Hampshire. The river flows west through the town of Newport and the city of Claremont, reaching the Connecticut across from the village of Ascutney, Vermont. Numerous falls and steep drops on the Sugar River have led to hydro-powered industrial development. Besides the large mill towns of Claremont and Newport, hydro-related developments occur in the villages of Sunapee, Wendell, Guild, and West Claremont. An inactive railroad known as the Concord to Claremont Line follows the Sugar River from Wendell to the river's mouth.

Tributaries of the Sugar River include the South Branch, entering in Newport, and the North Branch, entering between Newport and North Newport.

In popular culture
In the 1906 best-selling novel Coniston, "Coniston Water" was based on the Sugar River.

See also

List of rivers of New Hampshire

References

Rivers of New Hampshire
Tributaries of the Connecticut River
Rivers of Sullivan County, New Hampshire